The Colegio de la Inmaculada Concepción de Calatrava, commonly known as Colegio de Calatrava, is the only college founded in Salamanca by the military orders whose building still survives; it belonged to the Order of Calatrava.

History 

Instituted as an imperial college in 1552 by Charles V and incorporated into the University of Salamanca in 1554, the construction of this building did not begin until 1717, by Joaquín de Churriguera who directed the works until his death in 1724. In 1750 the works were resumed under the direction of Jerónimo García de Quiñones. He was forced to eliminate the baroque ornaments of the original project due to the neoclassicist ideas prevailing at that time, especially those that Francisco Ibáñez de Corbera, rector of the school when it was consecrated in 1790, wanted to impose. During the War of Independence, the Goya canvases in the altarpieces disappeared.

The facade has two bodies and is articulated by pilasters of giant order and topped with a balustrade. The decorative elements that adorn it are mostly of Renaissance inspiration. We notice in the decoration baroque mixtilinear elements around the main doorway, in the doors of the side towers and in the moldings that surround all the windows of the facade.

Today it is the seat of the Casa de la Iglesia, an institution that houses the offices of the Diocese of Salamanca.

References 
The original version of this article, or part of it, was obtained from wikisalamanca, which publishes under the CC by-sa 3.0 license.

Bibliography

External links 

Bien de Interés Cultural landmarks in the Province of Salamanca
Bienes de Interés Cultural